Edmir Ivo David Lucas (born 15 July 1993) is an Angolan basketball player who last played for the London Lions.

Professional career
Lucas started his career with the Westminster Warriors in the United Kingdom.

From 2012, he played for Angolan side Primeiro de Agosto in the Angolan BAI Basket.

In 2016, Lucas transferred between two of the biggest Angolan teams when he signed for two seasons with Petro de Luanda.

In 2018, Lucas signed with British team London City Royals of the British Basketball League (BBL). He won the 2018–19 BBL Trophy with the Royals.

With the withdrawal of the London City Royals, Lucas signed with the London Lions to replace Ogo Adegboye on 12 February 2020 for the remainder of the 2019–20 BBL season. On 14 February 2020 Lucas scored 8 points in 14 minutes of action in a 66–75 away win against the Bristol Flyers in only his second game with the team. He averaged 10 points per game shooting 40% from behind the arc. On 28 July 2020 Lucas re-signed with London.

International career
In May 2013, Lucas was summoned for the 2013 Afrobasket preliminary Angolan squad.

Honours
Primeiro de Agosto
FIBA Africa Clubs Champions Cup: 2013
Angolan League: 2015–16
London City Royals
BBL Trophy: 2018–19

Personal life
Lucas is married with two child.

References

1993 births
Living people
Angolan expatriate basketball people in the United Kingdom
Angolan men's basketball players
C.D. Primeiro de Agosto men's basketball players
London City Royals players
Shooting guards
London Lions (basketball) players